William James Peake Mason, 1st Baron Blackford JP (11 November 1862 – 21 July 1947), known as Sir William Mason, Bt, between 1918 and 1935, was a British politician and public servant.

Mason was the son of George Holt Mason, of Broadwater, Tunbridge Wells, Kent, and Laura Mary, daughter of Charles John Moakes. He was called to the Bar, Middle Temple, in 1891. In 1910 he unsuccessfully contested Finsbury East as a Conservative in both general elections of that year. During the First World War he was Chairman of Executive of the British Ambulance Committee and was created a Baronet in 1918 for "public and local services". Mason was also a Justice of the Peace for Somerset and served as High Sheriff of Somerset in 1928. In 1935 he was raised to the peerage as Baron Blackford, of Compton Pauncefoot in the County of Somerset, for "political and public services in the County of Somerset". There is no record of him having ever spoken in the House of Lords.

Lord Blackford married Edith, daughter of Alexander Murray Affleck, in 1885. He died in July 1947, aged 84, and was succeeded in the baronetcy and barony by his son, Glyn. Lady Blackford died in May 1958.

References

1862 births
1947 deaths
1
High Sheriffs of Somerset
Members of the Middle Temple
Barons created by George V